Ever Since is the eleventh and final studio album released by American singer Lesley Gore, released on June 28, 2005 on Engine Company Records. Produced by Blake Morgan, it was preceded by the 1982 album The Canvas Can Do Miracles, and was her first album of original material since 1975's Love Me by Name.

Reception 
In addition to extensive national radio coverage and critical acclaim from The New York Times, Rolling Stone, Billboard Magazine, and other national press, three songs from Ever Since have been used in television shows and a film: "Better Angels" in CSI: Miami'''s fourth season premiere episode, "Words We Don't Say" in an episode of The L Word'', and "It's Gone" in the Jeff Lipsky-directed film Flannel Pajamas.

Track listing

References

2005 albums
Lesley Gore albums
ECR Music Group albums
Albums produced by Blake Morgan